The fifty pound coin (£50) is a commemorative denomination of sterling coinage. Issued for the first time by the Royal Mint in 2015 and sold at face value, fifty pound coins hold legal tender status but are intended as collectors' items and are not found in general circulation. 100,000 coins will be produced in limited edition presentation.

Design
The designs which have appeared on the fifty pound coin's reverse are summarised in the table below.

See also

Coins of the pound sterling

References

Coins of the United Kingdom
Silver coins
Fifty-base-unit coins